During the 2003–04 English football season, Oldham Athletic A.F.C. competed in the Football League Second Division.

Results
Home team's score comes first

Legend

Football League Second Division

FA Cup

League Cup

Football League Trophy

Players

First-team squad
Squad at end of season

Left club during season

References

Notes

2003–04
Oldham Athletic